Bongimba Airport  is an airport serving Bongimba, a hamlet in Mai-Ndombe Province, Democratic Republic of the Congo.

See also

 Transport in the Democratic Republic of the Congo
 List of airports in the Democratic Republic of the Congo

References

External links
 OpenStreetMap - Bongimba Airport
 OurAirports - Bongimba Airport
 Bongimba Airport
 Google Maps - Bongimba Airport
 

Airports in Mai-Ndombe Province